John Poole may refer to:

Politicians
John Poole (Canadian politician) (1872–1963), member of the Legislative Assembly of Manitoba
John Poole (died 1601), MP for Liverpool
Sir John Poole, in 1593, MP for Much Wenlock (UK Parliament constituency)

Others
H. John Poole, military author
Jack Poole (1933–2009), Canadian businessman
John Poole (footballer, born 1892) (1892–1967), English football defender and manager
John Poole (footballer, born 1932) (1932–2020), English football goalkeeper for Port Vale
John Poole (playwright) (1786–1872), English playwright
John Poole (sculptor) (1926–2009), British sculptor
John C. Poole (1887–1926), American etcher and wood engraver
Jon Poole (born 1969), British singer-songwriter

See also
John Pool (1826–1884), US Senator
John Pool (MP) for Wycombe (UK Parliament constituency)